Edward William Christiansen Jr. (February 2, 1914 – March 28, 2000) was an American politician who served as a state representative and lieutenant governor in Montana.

Life

On February 24, 1914, Edward William Christiansen Jr. was born to Edward William Christiansen and Mabel C. Cork in Fargo, North Dakota. After graduating from North Dakota State University he married Hattie James on December 27, 1947 and moved to Hardin, Montana.

In 1964, he was elected to the Montana House of Representatives after defeating Republican Sam Denny and also served as one of Montana's presidential delegates to the 1964 Democratic National Convention. In 1971, the Democratic caucus in the House elected him as the House Minority Leader.

Although he was initially interested in running for governor in the 1972 election, he later chose to run for lieutenant governor after incumbent Lieutenant Governor Thomas Lee Judge announced that he would run for the governorship. Christiansen won the lieutenant gubernatorial election, but announced in 1976 that he wouldn't seek reelection and rejected a draft movement that attempted to have him primary Governor Thomas Lee Judge. During the 1980 Democratic Party presidential primaries he endorsed Senator Ted Kennedy.

On March 28, 2000, Christiansen died in Helena, Montana.

Electoral history

References

20th-century American politicians
1914 births
2000 deaths
Democratic Party members of the Montana House of Representatives
Lieutenant Governors of Montana
North Dakota State University alumni
People from Fargo, North Dakota
People from Hardin, Montana